City Hall MRT station is an underground Mass Rapid Transit (MRT) interchange station on the North South line (NSL) and East West line (EWL). Situated in the Downtown Core district of Singapore, it is underneath Stamford Road near the road junctions with North Bridge Road and St Andrew's Road. The station is near landmarks such as the City Hall, Raffles City, the Padang, St Andrew's Cathedral and The Cenotaph.

Initially named St Andrew's MRT station, the station was part of the early plans for the original MRT network since 1982. Construction of the tunnels between the City Hall and Raffles Place stations required the draining of the Singapore River. The station opened on 12 December 1987 with the MRT extension to Outram Park station. Cross-platform transfers between the NSL and EWL began on 28 October 1989, ahead of the opening of the MRT eastern line extension to Tanah Merah station on 4 November which split the MRT network into two lines. The station has three levels and is a designated Civil Defence shelter. The station features a mural by Simon Wong, depicting government buildings in the area.

History

The station, then named St Andrew's, was included in the early plans of the MRT network in May 1982. It was renamed to City Hall in November that year for historical reasons and to better reflect the area served. It was to be constructed as part of the Phase I MRT segment from the Novena to Outram Park stations; this segment was targeted to be completed by December 1987. This segment was given priority as it passes through areas that had a higher demand for public transport, such as the densely populated housing estates of Toa Payoh and Ang Mo Kio and the Central Area. The line aimed to relieve the traffic congestion on the Thomson–Sembawang road corridor.

The contract for the construction of four  tunnels between the City Hall and Raffles Place stations was awarded to a joint venture between Kajima Corporation and Keppel Shipyard in October 1983 at S$35.65 million (US$ million in ). Another contract for the construction of the station was awarded to a joint venture between Nishimatsu and Lum Chang at S$77.65 million (US$ million in ) in May 1984. Construction of the station began on 7 September 1984 with a Christian ceremony near the St Andrews' Cathedral. The gathering prayed for the safety of the cathedral and the construction workers, the successful completion of the station, and blessings for future commuters.

The construction of tunnels between the City Hall and Raffles Place stations required the draining of the Singapore River. The contractor used the cut-and-cover construction method since the tunnels, which cross over one another, would pass through a shallow part of the river. The tunnel boring machine was launched from Empress Place, which is just by the river bank. Due to the acidity of the Singapore River, a layer of concrete was added to the concrete frame around the tunnels, with a waterproofing additive for the base slab concrete. The concrete frame was designed to prevent any corrosion and floatation of the tunnels.

Due to requirements by the Ministry of Environment ensuring that the work site does not occupy more than 40% of the river width, the work would proceed in three stages. However, this restriction led to a limited work area. The piles installation was hindered by the boulders in the river, which had to be drilled through. The works were close to the historical monuments of the Immigration Building and the Cavenagh Bridge. These two sites had to be closely monitored for any ground movement. Monitoring instruments such as inclinometers and levelling pins were used to detect any structural movement.

There were concerns that the Cavenagh Bridge would not be able to absorb any significant strains with the settlement of the bridge's anchor blocks. Saddles, joined by prestressing cables, were placed on either side of the bridge to unload and loosen the links and bridge wedges. However, these wedges could not be loosened. Instead, other temporary supports were placed to relieve any stress on the bridge. After finding some cracks on the entrance façade of the Immigration Building, the contractors underpinned the columns at the entrance.

The first stage of the construction was completed in May 1985, with a delay of seven months. To speed up the construction, the Environment Ministry agreed to lift restrictions on the work area. The rest of the construction was completed in one stage, taking up the remaining  of the river width. The subsequent stage also used fewer piles with the mixed use of cut slopes. Installation of the 2nd stage cofferdam began in May and works were completed within 12 months.

During the station's construction, on 26 May 1985, the collapse of a portion of the supporting wall led to a landslip at the construction site. Those in the nearby St Andrew's Cathedral were evacuated as a safety precaution. The church was eventually declared safe for use and operations resumed on 2 June with the collapsed area backfilled. The engineers for the construction advised the church against using the half of the Cathedral near the site. On 10 December, a Japanese foreman miner died, having fallen through a shaft. It was noted that the foreman did not have his safety belt fastened. Investigations revealed that it was entirely an accident, with all other safety measures observed.

Train services commenced on 12 December 1987 when the line extension to Outram Park station was completed. The station was part of a route that ran continuously from Yishun station in the north to Lakeside station in the west. From 28 October 1989, it began to serve the NSL when MRT operations were split. In September 2000, the Land Transport Authority (LTA) installed lifts to allow barrier-free access to the station.

The LTA announced plans in May 2014 to construct a new underpass between the station and the redeveloped Capitol Singapore. Construction of the underground link and the new entrance started in the fourth quarter of 2014, and was completed in the first quarter of 2015. Another linkway to Funan Centre, first announced in November 2017, was completed in December 2021.

Station details

City Hall station is one of two stations which are paired cross-platform interchanges between the NSL and EWL. From the north, the station is after Bugis on the EWL and after Dhoby Ghaut station on the NSL. Both lines continue and interchange at Raffles Place station. The official station code is NS25/EW13. Before the MRT eastern extension to Tanah Merah station and the Marina Bay southern extension on 4 November 1989, through services operated from the Yishun to Lakeside stations. A few days before the opening, on 28 October, transfer drills were launched for commuters to familiarise themselves with transferring between the two services: with passengers from Yishun having to alight at either Raffles Place or City Hall to continue their journey to Lakeside or vice versa. In addition to advertisement campaigns and guides about the transfers, Mass Rapid Transit Corporation (MRTC) staff were deployed at the platforms to help commuters.

City Hall is one of the first nine underground MRT stations designated as a Civil Defence (CD) shelter. As a CD shelter, the station has to be structurally reinforced against bomb attacks with layers of earth-backed, air-backed and airtight walls and slabs. A mural by Simon Wong is displayed at this station as part of the MRTC's S$2 million (US$ million in ) commission of artworks at six MRT stations along the NSL. The mural, depicting government buildings in the area, reflects the station's themes of governance, justice and administration.

The station has four entrances. Located in the Singapore Civic District, the station is underneath Stamford Road near the junction with North Bridge Road. Surrounding the station are cultural landmarks such as City Hall, Peranakan Museum, The Padang, St Andrew's Cathedral, National Gallery Singapore, Old Supreme Court Building, Supreme Court of Singapore, Parliament House and The Cenotaph. Nearby commercial and retail developments include Marina Square, One Raffles Link, Raffles City and Suntec City. The station is within walking distance of the Esplanade and Bras Basah stations on the Circle line.

Notes and references

Footnotes

References

Bibliography

External links

 
 Changi Airport to City Hall MRT station route

Railway stations in Singapore opened in 1987
Downtown Core (Singapore)
Railway stations with vitreous enamel panels
Mass Rapid Transit (Singapore) stations